The Grand Army of the Republic Hall, also known as John M. Hagadorn Post No. 505, Grand Army of the Republic and the Schuyler F. Smith Camp No. 193, Sons of Union Veterans of the Civil War, and Halsey Valley Grand Army of the Republic Meeting Hall, is an historic building located on Hamilton Valley Road in Halsey Valley near Spencer, New York, in the United States. The hall was built in 1894 and on January 23, 2003, it was added to the U.S. National Register of Historic Places.

Original use
The hall was the meeting place of the John M. Hagadorn Post No. 505, which was one of 670 GAR posts in New York. It was also used as the meeting place of the Schuyler F. Smith Camp No. 193, SUVCW.

Current use
In September 1998, the Schuyler F. Smith Camp No. 193, SUVCW, was reactivated. It now meets in the hall on the first Sunday afternoon of each month.

See also
 Grand Army of the Republic
 Grand Army of the Republic Hall (disambiguation)
 List of Registered Historic Places in Tioga County, New York
 Sons of Union Veterans of the Civil War

References

External links
 NRHP.COM private site serving up public domain National Register listings for Tioga County
GAR Halls in New York
Schuyler F. Smith Camp  No. 193, SUVCW
 Library of Congress lists of GAR posts by state

Clubhouses on the National Register of Historic Places in New York (state)
New York
Buildings and structures in Tioga County, New York
National Register of Historic Places in Tioga County, New York
Buildings and structures completed in 1894
1894 establishments in New York (state)